The Elitar-202 or Elitar (Samara VVV-Avia) 202 is a conventionally laid out, single engine ultralight aircraft which seats two in side-by-side configuration. Designed in Russia, production of the Type 202 began in 2003.

Design and development

Like the Elitar Sigma, the Elitar-202 is manufactured at Samara by VVV-Avia. It is a low wing monoplane constructed largely of composites, with foam filled GRP surfaces and GRP/carbon fibre wing spars.  The wings are fitted with flaps and in plan have rounded leading edges near the upturned tips.  The leading edge of the fin is strongly swept; the rudder is less swept and has a cut-away at its base for elevator movement.  There is a small ventral fin.

The side-by-side seating is enclosed by a rear hinged, largely transparent canopy, with another transparency behind on each side of the rearward tapering fuselage. The 202 is powered by a 73.5 kW (98.6 hp) Rotax 912ULS flat four engine driving a three blade propeller.  It has a fixed, tricycle undercarriage, with faired mainwheels mounted on cantilever spring legs and a trailing link nosewheel. A MVEN K-700-00 ballistic recovery parachute is an option.

Operational history
The 202 was first seen in public in 2003 at MAKS '03 in Moscow. Ten were reported built and twelve more on order at this time. It was predicted that certification would be completed by November 2003 but in 2009 this remained unconfirmed.

Specifications

References

2000s Russian sport aircraft